Nochern is a municipality and village in the district of Rhein-Lahn, in Rhineland-Palatinate, in western Germany. It has 12 hectares of vineyards facing south down into the Rhine valley. The Rheinsteig walking track passes it.

References

Municipalities in Rhineland-Palatinate
Rhein-Lahn-Kreis